Anders Conrad Wilhelm Almqvist (2 July 1885 – 30 November 1915) was a Swedish rower who competed in the 1912 Summer Olympics. He was a member of the Swedish boat Göteborgs that was eliminated in the first round of the men's eight tournament.

References

External links

1885 births
1915 deaths
Swedish male rowers
Olympic rowers of Sweden
Rowers at the 1912 Summer Olympics
Sportspeople from Gothenburg